Raphael Salvador Diaz (born January 9, 1986) is a Swiss professional ice hockey defenceman who currently plays with HC Fribourg-Gottéron in the National League (NL). Diaz previously played with the Rangers during the 2014 season after the trade deadline. He began his professional career with EV Zug in 2003 and has also played with the Montreal Canadiens, Vancouver Canucks, New York Rangers and the Calgary Flames. After returning to Switzerland with EV Zug Diaz has won the 2019 Swiss Cup and the 2020-21 NL Championship

Diaz was selected to play for the Switzerland men's national ice hockey team at the 2010 and 2014 Winter Olympics. He previously represented Switzerland at the 2004 IIHF World U18 Championships, the 2005 and 2006 IIHF World U20 Championship, the 2008 Ice Hockey World Championship, and captained the team at the 2017 Spengler Cup.

Playing career
As a youth, Diaz played in the 2000 Quebec International Pee-Wee Hockey Tournament with a team from Central Switzerland.

On May 13, 2011, Diaz signed a one-year two-way contract with the Montreal Canadiens of the NHL. He made his NHL debut October 6, 2011 against the Toronto Maple Leafs. Diaz scored his first NHL goal on October 18, 2011, against Ryan Miller of the Buffalo Sabres in the 2nd Period. He appeared as a rookie team member at the 2012 All Star game skills competition, as an injury replacement for Adam Larsson. He participated in the G Series NHL Skills Challenge Relay performing the control relay skill skating with the puck through a series of 6 cones. Diaz was traded to the Vancouver Canucks on February 3, 2014, for Dale Weise.

On March 5, 2014, Diaz was traded to the New York Rangers for a 5th-round pick in the 2015 NHL Entry Draft

After attending the Calgary Flames training camp on a try-out, Diaz capped a successful pre-season by signing a one-year contract with the club on October 6, 2014.

On July 1, 2015, the New York Rangers signed Diaz as a free agent to a one-year, $700,000 contract. In his return to the Rangers organization, Diaz was assigned to AHL affiliate, the Hartford Wolf Pack for the duration of the 2015–16 regular season. On December 23, 2015, Diaz was signed by the EV Zug to a five-year, CHF 5 million contract starting in the 2016–17 season.

On June 2, 2017, Diaz was named captain of EV Zug. He won his first NL title with Zug in 2021.

On January 27, 2021, Diaz was signed to a four-year deal by HC Fribourg-Gottéron, starting with the 2021–22 season and through the 2024–25 season.

Personal life
Diaz's father is originally from Spain, while his mother is Swiss. His name was originally 'Rafael,' and is still used by the Swiss national team, though as his passport uses 'Raphael,' he uses that as his official name.

His sister Daniela Diaz also played hockey.

Career statistics

Regular season and playoffs

International

References

External links

1986 births
Living people
Calgary Flames players
Hartford Wolf Pack players
Ice hockey players at the 2010 Winter Olympics
Ice hockey players at the 2014 Winter Olympics
Ice hockey players at the 2018 Winter Olympics
Ice hockey players at the 2022 Winter Olympics
Montreal Canadiens players
New York Rangers players
Olympic ice hockey players of Switzerland
People from Baar, Switzerland
Sportspeople from the canton of Zug
Swiss ice hockey defencemen
Swiss people of Spanish descent
Undrafted National Hockey League players
Vancouver Canucks players
EV Zug players